Steve Johnson and Austin Krajicek were the defending champions but Johnson decided not to participate.
Krajicek played alongside Devin Britton.
Alex Kuznetsov and Mischa Zverev defeated Jean Andersen and Izak van der Merwe 6–4, 6–2 in the final.

Seeds

Draw

Draw

References
 Main Draw

Knoxville Challenger - Doubles
2012 Doubles